Dickey Lee Hullinghorst (born July 27, 1943) is a former legislator in the U.S. state of Colorado and a former Speaker of the Colorado House of Representatives. She was elected as a Democrat in 2008. Hullinghorst represented House District 10, which encompasses central eastern Boulder and northeastern Boulder County, Colorado.

She is only the second woman in state history to hold that position.
It is the first time since 1880 a Boulder County, Colorado lawmaker has been the Speaker of the House.

Biography

Born Dickey Lee Shepard (named after her father, Richard), in Maywood, Nebraska, Hullinghorst earned a bachelor's degree in sociology from the University of Wyoming in 1965 and has completed graduate work in public policy at the University of Colorado, Denver. She has worked as a computer programmer for the U.S. Department of Housing and Urban Development in Washington, DC, as legislative affairs director for the Colorado Open Space Council from 1979 to 1980 and as senior vice president for Herrick S. Roth Associates, a Denver public policy consulting firm, from 1980 to 1985.

Starting in 1985, Hullinghorst worked as Intergovernmental Relations Director for Boulder County, Colorado. She spearheaded the 2003 creation of the "Boulder County Countywide Coordinated Comprehensive Development Plan Intergovernmental Agreement," or "Super IGA," governing Boulder County development and land-preservation policies over a two-decade timeframe. In recognition of this work, she received the Metro Vision First Place Award from the Denver Regional Council of Governments (DRCOG) and the National Association of Counties (NACo) intergovernmental cooperation award.  She also received the Local Government Collaboration Gold Award for work on an IGA targeting Colorado State Highway 42 revitalization. Additionally, Hullinghorst's position entailed lobbying the state legislature on behalf of Boulder County. Hullinghorst retired in December 2007 upon announcing her campaign for the state legislature.

She has served on a number of local boards and commissions, including Boulder County's Parks and Open Space Advisory Committee, Healthy Communities Steering Committee, Resource Conservation Advisory Board, and Mental Health Center Board, as well as the city of Boulder's Blue Ribbon Commission on Revenue Stability. During the early 1980s, Hullinghorst received gubernatorial appointments to the Colorado Mined Land Reclamation Board, the Front Range Project Steering Committee, and the Metropolitan Water Roundtable. She helped found the Colorado Open Lands Board, and served on the boards of EcoCycle, Political Action for Conservation, and PLAN Boulder County. Hullinghorst also once played oboe with the Longmont symphony.

A veteran of Democratic Party politics, Hullinghorst was a delegate to the 1976 Democratic National Convention and has served in a number of roles with the Boulder County Democratic Party, as a precinct committeeperson, member of the central and executive committees, finance chair, GOTV co-chair, county vice-chair, and as county chair from 1975 to 1979. She has also served on the executive committee of the Colorado Democratic Party, and vice-president of the Colorado Women's Political Caucus in the 1970s and as president of the Colorado Democratic Women's Political Action from 2000 to 2002.

Hullinghorst currently lives in Gunbarrel, Colorado. Her husband, Bob Hullinghorst, was Boulder County Treasurer. They have one daughter, Lara.

Legislative career

2008 campaign
In October 2007, Hullinghorst announced her candidacy for the state house seat being vacated by term-limited Rep. Alice Madden. She had no opposition in the Democratic primary and, in the general election, faced Republican Dorothy Marshall, a Boulder health insurance agent whose bid was endorsed by the Denver Post. Hullinghorst's campaign, however, was endorsed by the Boulder Daily Camera and the Boulder Weekly. Hullinghorst touted her government experience, and emphasized tax reform and the state budget in her legislative campaign. She ultimately won the general election with 75 percent of the popular vote.

2009 legislative session

For the 2009 legislative session, Hullinghorst was named to seats on the House Agriculture and Natural Resources Committee and the House State, Veterans, and Military Affairs Committee.

2010 legislative session

For the 2010 legislative session, Hullinghorst was named to the House Appropriations Committee, filling a seat previously held by Representative Kathleen Curry.

2010 election

2011 legislative session

2012 legislative session

2012 election
In the 2012 General Election, Representative Hullinghorst faced Republican challenger William H. Eckert.  Hullinghorst was reelected by a wide margin of 80% to 20%.

See also
List of female speakers of legislatures in the United States

References

External links
 Campaign web site

1943 births
American Episcopalians
Living people
Speakers of the Colorado House of Representatives
Democratic Party members of the Colorado House of Representatives
People from Boulder County, Colorado
People from Frontier County, Nebraska
University of Colorado Denver alumni
University of Wyoming alumni
Women state legislators in Colorado
21st-century American politicians
21st-century American women politicians
Women legislative speakers